Frederick Lau (born 17 August 1989) is a German actor.

Biography 
He grew up and still lives in Berlin-Steglitz. He was awarded the Deutscher Filmpreis (German Film Awards, colloquially known as the Lolas) for portraying the student Tim in the film Die Welle based on the novel by Todd Strasser. Since 2000 he has played over 50 roles in film and television.

Filmography

Film

Television

References

External links
 

Living people
1989 births
German male film actors
German male television actors
German male child actors
21st-century German male actors
German Film Award winners
People from Steglitz-Zehlendorf
Male actors from Berlin